Mount Emmons is a mountain summit in the Elk Mountains range of the Rocky Mountains in north-central Gunnison County, Colorado, United States.

Description

The mountain was named in honor of geologist Samuel Franklin Emmons (as was another peak in Utah).

Historical names
 Mount Emmons 
 Red Lady

See also

 List of Colorado mountain ranges
 List of Colorado mountain summits
 List of Colorado fourteeners
 List of Colorado 4000 meter prominent summits
 List of the most prominent summits of Colorado
 List of Colorado county high points
 Mount Emmons (Utah)

References

External links

 

Mountains of Colorado
Mountains of Gunnison County, Colorado
Gunnison National Forest
North American 3000 m summits